Pholcus is a genus of spiders in the family Pholcidae, with 375 described species as of January 2023. 

It includes the cellar spider P. phalangioides, often called the "daddy longlegs". This may cause confusion because the name "daddy longlegs" is also applied to two other unrelated arthropods: the harvestman and the crane fly.

Description 
Pholcus, like Pholcidae in general, have extremely long and thin legs. The genus can be distinguished from other pholcid genera by its large size (body length >4 mm), eight eyes, evenly domed prosoma (lacking a median furrow or pit) and cylindrical opisthosoma (longer than it is high).

Habitat 
In the wild, Pholcus live in environments such as caves, under rocks, forest shrubs and deep limestone cracks. Synanthropic species such as P. phalangioides live in and around buildings and other disturbed habitats.

Species

 Pholcus abstrusus Yao & Li, 2012 — China
 Pholcus acutulus Paik, 1978 — Korea
 Pholcus aduncus Yao & Li, 2012 — China
 Pholcus afghanus Senglet, 2008 — Afghanistan
 Pholcus agilis Yao & Li, 2012 — China
 Pholcus alagarkoil (Huber, 2011) — India
 Pholcus alloctospilus Zhu & Gong, 1991 — China
 Pholcus alpinus Yao & Li, 2012 — China
 Pholcus alticeps Spassky, 1932 — Poland to Russia, Iran
 Pholcus amani Huber, 2011 — Tanzania
 Pholcus anachoreta Dimitrov & Ribera, 2006 — Canary Islands
 Pholcus ancoralis L. Koch, 1865 — Ryukyu Islands to Hawaii, New Caledonia, Marquesas Islands, Rapa
 Pholcus anlong Chen, Zhang & Zhu, 2011 — China
 Pholcus arayat Huber, 2011 — Philippines
 Pholcus arcuatilis Yao & Li, 2013 — Laos
 Pholcus arkit Huber, 2011 — Central Asia
 Pholcus armeniacus Senglet, 1974 — Iran
 Pholcus arsacius Senglet, 2008 — Iran
 Pholcus attuleh Huber, 2011 — Cameroon
 Pholcus auricularis Zhang, Zhang & Liu, 2016 — China
 Pholcus babao Tong & Li, 2010 — China
 Pholcus baguio Huber, 2016 — Philippines
 Pholcus bailongensis Yao & Li, 2012 — China
 Pholcus bajia (Lu, Yao & He, 2022) — China
 Pholcus baka Huber, 2011 — West, Central Africa
 Pholcus bakweri Huber, 2011 — Bioko, Cameroon
 Pholcus baldiosensis Wunderlich, 1992 — Canary Islands
 Pholcus bamboutos Huber, 2011 — Cameroon
 Pholcus bangfai Huber, 2011 — Laos
 Pholcus bantouensis Yao & Li, 2012 — China
 Pholcus bat Lan & Li, 2021 — China
 Pholcus batepa Huber, 2011 — Sao Tome
 Pholcus beijingensis Zhu & Song, 1999 — China
 Pholcus berlandi Millot, 1941 — Senegal
 Pholcus bessus Zhu & Gong, 1991 — China
 Pholcus bicornutus Simon, 1892 — Philippines
 Pholcus bidentatus Zhu et al., 2005 — China, Laos
 Pholcus bifidus Yao, Pham & Li, 2015 — Vietnam
 Pholcus bikilai Huber, 2011 — Ethiopia
 Pholcus bimbache Dimitrov & Ribera, 2006 — Canary Islands
 Pholcus bing Yao & Li, 2012 — China
 Pholcus bolikhamsai Huber, 2011 — Laos
 Pholcus bourgini Millot, 1941 — Guinea
 Pholcus brevis Yao & Li, 2012 — China
 Pholcus bulacanensis Yao & Li, 2017 — Philippines (Luzon)
 Pholcus caecus Yao, Pham & Li, 2015 — Vietnam
 Pholcus calcar Wunderlich, 1987 — Canary Islands
 Pholcus calligaster Thorell, 1895 — Myanmar, Nepal
 Pholcus camba Huber, 2011 — Sulawesi
 Pholcus caspius Senglet, 2008 — Iran
 Pholcus ceheng Chen, Zhang & Zhu, 2011 — China
 Pholcus cenranaensis Yao & Li, 2016 — Indonesia (Sulawesi)
 Pholcus ceylonicus O. Pickard-Cambridge, 1869 — Sri Lanka, possibly Malaysia
 Pholcus chang Yao & Li, 2012 — China
 Pholcus changchi Yao, Li & Lu, 2022 — China
 Pholcus chappuisi Fage, 1936 — Kenya
 Pholcus chattoni Millot, 1941 — Guinea, Ivory Coast
 Pholcus cheaha Huber, 2011 — USA
 Pholcus chengde Yao, Li & Lu, 2022 — China
 Pholcus cheongogensis Kim & Ye, 2015 — Korea
 Pholcus chevronus Yin, Xu & Bao, 2012 — China
 Pholcus chiakensis  Seo, 2014 — Korea
 Pholcus chicheng Tong & Li, 2010 — China
 Pholcus chilgapsanensis J. G. Lee & J. H. Lee, 2021 — Korea
 Pholcus choctaw Huber, 2011 — USA
 Pholcus chuncheonensis J. G. Lee, Choi & S. K. Kim, 2021 — Korea
 Pholcus circularis Kraus, 1960 — Sao Tome
 Pholcus clavatus Schenkel, 1936 — China
 Pholcus clavimaculatus Zhu & Song, 1999 — China
 Pholcus cophenius Senglet, 2008 — Afghanistan
 Pholcus corcho Wunderlich, 1987 — Canary Islands
 Pholcus corniger Dimitrov & Ribera, 2006 — Canary Islands
 Pholcus crassipalpis Spassky, 1937 — Bulgaria, Ukraine, Russia (Europe, Caucasus), Turkey, Kazakhstan
 Pholcus crassus Paik, 1978 — Korea
 Pholcus creticus Senglet, 1971 — Crete
 Pholcus crypticolenoides Kim, Lee & Lee, 2015 — Korea
 Pholcus crypticolens Bösenberg & Strand, 1906 — Japan
 Pholcus cuneatus Yao & Li, 2012 — China
 Pholcus curvus Zhang, Zhang & Liu, 2016 — China
 Pholcus dade Huber, 2011 — USA
 Pholcus dali Zhang & Zhu, 2009 — China
 Pholcus datan Tong & Li, 2010 — China
 Pholcus datong (Yao, Li & Lu, 2022) — China
 Pholcus debilis (Thorell, 1899) — Bioko, Cameroon
 Pholcus decorus Yao & Li, 2012 — China
 Pholcus dentatus Wunderlich, 1995 — Madeira
 Pholcus deunggolensis Kim & Kim, 2016 — Korea
 Pholcus dieban Yao & Li, 2012 — China
 Pholcus difengensis Yao & Li, 2016 — China
 Pholcus dixie Huber, 2011 — USA
 Pholcus djelalabad Senglet, 2008 — Afghanistan, India
 Pholcus dongxue Yao & Li, 2017 — Thailand
 Pholcus doucki Huber, 2011 — Guinea
 Pholcus duan Yao & Li, 2017 — Thailand
 Pholcus dungara Huber, 2001 — Queensland
 Pholcus edentatus Campos & Wunderlich, 1995 — Canary Islands
 Pholcus elymaeus Senglet, 2008 — Iran
 Pholcus exilis Tong & Li, 2010 — China
 Pholcus extumidus Paik, 1978 — Korea, Japan
 Pholcus fagei (Kratochvíl, 1940) — Kenya
 Pholcus faveauxi (Lawrence, 1967) — Congo
 Pholcus fengcheng Zhang & Zhu, 2009 — China
 Pholcus fengning (Yao, Li & Lu, 2022) — China
 Pholcus foliaceus Peng & Zhang, 2013 — China
 Pholcus fragillimus Strand, 1907 — Sri Lanka, India to Japan
 Pholcus fuerteventurensis Wunderlich, 1992 — Canary Islands, Morocco
 Pholcus gaizhou Yao & Li, 2021 — China
 Pholcus gajiensis Seo, 2014 — Korea
 Pholcus ganziensis Yao & Li, 2012 — China
 Pholcus gaoi Song & Ren, 1994 — China
 Pholcus genuiformis Wunderlich, 1995 — Algeria
 Pholcus gomerae Wunderlich, 1980 — Canary Islands
 Pholcus gonggarensis Yao & Li, 2016 — China
 Pholcus gosuensis Kim & Lee, 2004 — Korea
 Pholcus gracillimus Thorell, 1890 — Malaysia, Singapore, Sumatra, Java
 Pholcus guadarfia Dimitrov & Ribera, 2007 — Canary Islands
 Pholcus guangling (Yao, Li & Lu, 2022) — China
 Pholcus guani Song & Ren, 1994 — China
 Pholcus guanshui Yao & Li, 2021 — China
 Pholcus gui Zhu & Song, 1999 — China
 Pholcus guineensis Millot, 1941 — Guinea, Sierra Leone
 Pholcus hamaensis Yao & Li, 2016 — China
 Pholcus hamatus Tong & Ji, 2010 — China
 Pholcus hamuchal Yao & Li, 2020 — Pakistan
 Pholcus harveyi Zhang & Zhu, 2009 — China
 Pholcus helenae Wunderlich, 1987 — Canary Islands
 Pholcus henanensis Zhu & Mao, 1983 — China
 Pholcus hieroglyphicus Pavesi, 1883 — Eritrea
 Pholcus higoensis Irie & Ono, 2008 — Japan
 Pholcus hinsonensis Yao & Li, 2016 — Thailand
 Pholcus hochiminhi Yao, Pham & Li, 2015 — Vietnam
 Pholcus hoyo Huber, 2011 — Congo
 Pholcus huailai Yao, Li & Lu, 2022 — China
 Pholcus huapingensis Yao & Li, 2012 — China
 Pholcus huberi Zhang & Zhu, 2009 — China
 Pholcus hunyuan (Yao, Li & Lu, 2022) — China
 Pholcus huoxiaerensis Yao & Li, 2016 — China
 Pholcus hyrcanus Senglet, 1974 — Iran
 Pholcus hytaspus Senglet, 2008 — Iran
 Pholcus imbricatus Yao & Li, 2012 — China
 Pholcus incheonensis J. G. Lee & J. H. Lee, 2021 — Korea
 Pholcus intricatus Dimitrov & Ribera, 2003 — Canary Islands
 Pholcus jaegeri Huber, 2011 — Laos
 Pholcus jiaotu Yao & Li, 2012 — China
 Pholcus jiguanshan Yao & Li, 2021 — China
 Pholcus jindongensis Seo, 2018 — Korea
 Pholcus jingnan Yao & Li, 2020 — China
 Pholcus jingyangensis Yao & Li, 2016 — China
 Pholcus jinniu Tong & Li, 2010 — China
 Pholcus jinwum Huber, 2001 — Queensland
 Pholcus jiulong Tong & Li, 2010 — China
 Pholcus jiuwei Tong & Ji, 2010 — China China
 Pholcus jixianensis Zhu & Yu, 1983 — China
 Pholcus joreongensis Seo, 2004 — Korea
 Pholcus jusahi Huber, 2011 — USA
 Pholcus juwangensis Seo, 2014 — Korea
 Pholcus kaebyaiensis Yao & Li, 2016 — Thailand
 Pholcus kakum Huber, 2009 — Ghana, Ivory Coast, Guinea, Congo
 Pholcus kalam Yao & Li, 2020 — Pakistan
 Pholcus kamkaly Huber, 2011 — Kazakhstan
 Pholcus kandahar Senglet, 2008 — Afghanistan
 Pholcus kangding Zhang & Zhu, 2009 — China
 Pholcus kapuri Tikader, 1977 — Andaman Islands
 Pholcus karawari Huber, 2011 — New Guinea
 Pholcus kawit Huber, 2016 — Philippines
 Pholcus kihansi Huber, 2011 — Tanzania
 Pholcus kimi Song & Zhu, 1994 — China, Laos
 Pholcus kindia Huber, 2011 — Guinea
 Pholcus kingi Huber, 2011 — USA
 Pholcus knoeseli Wunderlich, 1992 — Canary Islands
 Pholcus koah Huber, 2001 — Queensland
 Pholcus koasati Huber, 2011 — USA
 Pholcus kohi Huber, 2011 — Malaysia, Singapore, Sumatra
 Pholcus krachensis Yao & Li, 2016 — Thailand
 Pholcus kribi Huber, 2011 — Cameroon
 Pholcus kuaile (Yao, Li & Lu, 2022) — China
 Pholcus kui Yao & Li, 2012 — China
 Pholcus kunming Zhang & Zhu, 2009 — China
 Pholcus kwamgumi Huber, 2011 — Kenya, Tanzania
 Pholcus kwanaksanensis Namkung & Kim, 1990 — Korea
 Pholcus kwangkyosanensis Kim & Park, 2009 — Korea
 Pholcus kyondo Huber, 2011 — Congo
 Pholcus laksao Huber, 2011 — Laos
 Pholcus lamperti Strand, 1907 — Tanzania, possibly Zanzibar
 Pholcus langensis Yao & Li, 2016 — China
 Pholcus lanieri Huber, 2011 — USA
 Pholcus leruthi Lessert, 1935 — Congo, East Africa
 Pholcus lexuancanhi Yao, Pham & Li, 2012 — Vietnam
 Pholcus lijiangensis Yao & Li, 2012 — China
 Pholcus lilangai Huber, 2011 — Tanzania
 Pholcus lingguanensis Yao & Li, 2016 — China
 Pholcus lingulatus Gao, Gao & Zhu, 2002 — China
 Pholcus linzhou Zhang & Zhang, 2000 — China
 Pholcus liui Yao & Li, 2012 — China
 Pholcus liutu Yao & Li, 2012 — China
 Pholcus longlin Yao & Li, 2020 — China
 Pholcus longus Yao & Li, 2016 — China
 Pholcus longxigu Yao & Li, 2021 — China
 Pholcus lualaba Huber, 2011 — Congo
 Pholcus luanping (Yao & Li, 2022) — China
 Pholcus luding Tong & Li, 2010 — China
 Pholcus luki Huber, 2011 — Congo
 Pholcus luoquanbei Yao & Li, 2021 — China
 Pholcus lupanga Huber, 2011 — Tanzania
 Pholcus luya Peng & Zhang, 2013 — China
 Pholcus madeirensis Wunderlich, 1987 — Madeira
 Pholcus magnus Wunderlich, 1987 — Madeira
 Pholcus malpaisensis Wunderlich, 1992 — Canary Islands
 Pholcus manueli Gertsch, 1937 — Kazakhstan, Turkmenistan, Russia (Far East), China, Korea, Japan. Introduced to USA
 Pholcus mao Yao & Li, 2012 — China
 Pholcus maronita Brignoli, 1977 — Lebanon
 Pholcus mascaensis Wunderlich, 1987 — Canary Islands
 Pholcus maxian Lu, Yang & He, 2021 — China
 Pholcus mazumbai Huber, 2011 — Tanzania
 Pholcus mbuti Huber, 2011 — Congo
 Pholcus mecheria Huber, 2011 — Algeria
 Pholcus medicus Senglet, 1974 — Iran
 Pholcus medog Zhang, Zhu & Song, 2006 — China, India
 Pholcus mengla Song & Zhu, 1999 — China
 Pholcus mentawir Huber, 2011 — Borneo
 Pholcus metta Huber, 2019 — Sri Lanka
 Pholcus mianshanensis Zhang & Zhu, 2009 — China
 Pholcus mirabilis Yao & Li, 2012 — China
 Pholcus mixiaoqii Xu, Zhang & Yao, 2019 — China
 Pholcus moca Huber, 2011 — Bioko, Cameroon
 Pholcus montanus Paik, 1978 — Korea
 Pholcus multidentatus Wunderlich, 1987 — Canary Islands
 Pholcus mulu Huber, 2016 — Philippines
 Pholcus muralicola Maughan & Fitch, 1976 — USA
 Pholcus musensis Yao & Li, 2016 — Thailand
 Pholcus nagasakiensis Strand, 1918 — Japan
 Pholcus namkhan Huber, 2011 — Laos
 Pholcus negara Huber, 2011 — Bali
 Pholcus nenjukovi Spassky, 1936 — Central Asia
 Pholcus ningan Yao & Li, 2018 — China
 Pholcus nkoetye Huber, 2011 — Cameroon
 Pholcus nodong Huber, 2011 — Korea
 Pholcus obscurus Yao & Li, 2012 — China
 Pholcus oculosus Zhang & Zhang, 2000 — China
 Pholcus okgye Huber, 2011 — Korea
 Pholcus olangapo Huber, 2016 — Philippines
 Pholcus opilionoides (Schrank, 1781) — Europe to Azerbaijan
 Pholcus ornatus Bösenberg, 1895 — Canary Islands
 Pholcus otomi Huber, 2011 — Japan
 Pholcus ovatus Yao & Li, 2012 — China
 Pholcus pagbilao Huber, 2011 — Philippines
 Pholcus pajuensis J. G. Lee, Choi & S. K. Kim, 2021 — Korea
 Pholcus palgongensis Seo, 2014 — Korea
 Pholcus papilionis Peng & Zhang, 2011 — China
 Pholcus papillatus Zhang, Zhang & Liu, 2016 — China
 Pholcus paralinzhou Zhang & Zhu, 2009 — China
 Pholcus parayichengicus Zhang & Zhu, 2009 — China
 Pholcus parkyeonensis Kim & Yoo, 2009 — Korea
 Pholcus parthicus Senglet, 2008 — Iran
 Pholcus parvus Wunderlich, 1987 — Madeira
 Pholcus pennatus Zhang, Zhu & Song, 2005 — China
 Pholcus persicus Senglet, 1974 — Iran
 Pholcus phalangioides (Fuesslin, 1775) — Cosmopolitan
 Pholcus phnombak Lan, Jäger & Li, 2021 — Cambodia
 Pholcus phoenixus Zhang & Zhu, 2009 — China
 Pholcus phungiformes Oliger, 1983 — Russia
 Pholcus piagolensis Seo, 2018 — Korea
 Pholcus ping Yao & Li, 2017 — Vietnam
 Pholcus pocheonensis J. G. Lee, Choi & S. K. Kim, 2021 — Korea
 Pholcus pojeonensis Kim & Yoo, 2008 — Korea
 Pholcus ponticus Thorell, 1875 — Romania, Bulgaria to China
 Pholcus punu Huber, 2014 — Gabon
 Pholcus puranappui Huber, 2019 — Sri Lanka
 Pholcus pyeongchangensis Seo, 2018 — Korea
 Pholcus qingchengensis Gao, Gao & Zhu, 2002 — China
 Pholcus qingyunensis Yao & Li, 2016 — China
 Pholcus quinghaiensis Song & Zhu, 1999 — China
 Pholcus rawiriae Huber, 2014 — Gabon
 Pholcus reevesi Huber, 2011 — USA
 Pholcus roquensis Wunderlich, 1992 — Canary Islands
 Pholcus ruteng Huber, 2011 — Flores
 Pholcus saaristoi Zhang & Zhu, 2009 — China
 Pholcus saidovi Yao & Li, 2017 — Tajikistan
 Pholcus sakaew Yao & Li, 2018 — Thailand
 Pholcus schawalleri Yao, Li & Jäger, 2014 — Philippines
 Pholcus seokmodoensis J. G. Lee & J. H. Lee, 2021 — China
 Pholcus seorakensis Seo, 2018 — Korea
 Pholcus seoulensis J. G. Lee & J. H. Lee, 2021 — Korea
 Pholcus shangrila Zhang & Zhu, 2009 — China
 Pholcus shenshi Yao & Li, 2021 — Korea
 Pholcus shuangtu Yao & Li, 2012 — China
 Pholcus shuguanensis Yao & Li, 2017 — Tajikistan
 Pholcus sidorenkoi Dunin, 1994 — Russia, Tajikistan
 Pholcus silvai Wunderlich, 1995 — Madeira
 Pholcus simbok Huber, 2011 — Korea
 Pholcus socheunensis Paik, 1978 — Korea
 Pholcus sogdianae Brignoli, 1978 — Central Asia
 Pholcus sokkrisanensis Paik, 1978 — Korea
 Pholcus songi Zhang & Zhu, 2009 — China
 Pholcus songkhonensis Yao & Li, 2016 — Thailand
 Pholcus songxian Zhang & Zhu, 2009 — China
 Pholcus soukous Huber, 2011 — Congo
 Pholcus spasskyi Brignoli, 1978 — Turkey
 Pholcus spiliensis Wunderlich, 1995 — Crete
 Pholcus spilis Zhu & Gong, 1991 — China
 Pholcus steineri Huber, 2011 — Laos
 Pholcus strandi Caporiacco, 1941 — Ethiopia
 Pholcus sublaksao Yao & Li, 2013 — Laos
 Pholcus sublingulatus Zhang & Zhu, 2009 — China
 Pholcus suboculosus Peng & Zhang, 2011 — China
 Pholcus subwuyiensis Zhang & Zhu, 2009 — China
 Pholcus suizhongicus Zhu & Song, 1999 — China
 Pholcus sumatraensis Wunderlich, 1995 — Sumatra
 Pholcus suraksanensis J. G. Lee & J. H. Lee, 2021 — Korea
 Pholcus sveni Wunderlich, 1987 — Canary Islands
 Pholcus taarab Huber, 2011 — Tanzania, Malawi
 Pholcus taibaiensis Wang & Zhu, 1992 — China
 Pholcus taibeli Caporiacco, 1949 — Ethiopia
 Pholcus taishan Song & Zhu, 1999 — China
 Pholcus taita Huber, 2011 — Kenya
 Pholcus tang (Yao & Li, 2012) — China
 Pholcus tangyuensis Yao & Li, 2016  — China
 Pholcus tenerifensis Wunderlich, 1987 — Canary Islands
 Pholcus thakek Huber, 2011 — Laos
 Pholcus tianmenshan Yao & Li, 2021 — China
 Pholcus tianmuensis Yao & Li, 2016 — China
 Pholcus tongi Yao & Li, 2012 — China
 Pholcus tongyaoi Wang & Yao, 2020 — China
 Pholcus triangulatus Zhang & Zhang, 2000 — China
 Pholcus tuoyuan Yao & Li, 2012 — China
 Pholcus turcicus Wunderlich, 1980 — Turkey
 Pholcus tuyan Yao & Li, 2012 — China
 Pholcus twa Huber, 2011 — East Africa
 Pholcus uiseongensis Seo, 2018 — Korea
 Pholcus umphang Yao & Li, 2018 — Thailand
 Pholcus unaksanensis J. G. Lee, Choi & S. K. Kim, 2021 — Korea
 Pholcus undatus Yao & Li, 2012 — China
 Pholcus uva Huber, 2019 — Sri Lanka
 Pholcus varirata Huber, 2011 — New Guinea
 Pholcus vatovae Caporiacco, 1940 — East Africa
 Pholcus velitchkovskyi Kulczynski, 1913 — Russia, Ukraine, Iran
 Pholcus vietnamensis Yao & Li, 2017 — Vietnam
 Pholcus viveki Sen et al., 2015 — China
 Pholcus wahehe Huber, 2011 — Tanzania
 Pholcus wangi Yao & Li, 2012 — China
 Pholcus wangjiang Yao & Li, 2021 — China
 Pholcus wangtian Tong & Ji, 2010 — China
 Pholcus wangxidong Zhang & Zhu, 2009 — China
 Pholcus woongil Huber, 2011 — Korea
 Pholcus wuling Tong & Li, 2010 — China
 Pholcus wuyiensis Zhu & Gong, 1991 — China
 Pholcus xianrendong Liu & Tong, 2015 — China
 Pholcus xiaotu Yao & Li, 2012 — China
 Pholcus xinglong (Yao, Li & Lu, 2022) — China
 Pholcus xingqi Yao & Li, 2021 — China
 Pholcus xingren Chen, Zhang & Zhu, 2011 — China
 Pholcus xingyi Chen, Zhang & Zhu, 2011 — China
 Pholcus xinzhou (Yao, Li & Lu, 2022) — China
 Pholcus yangi Zhang & Zhu, 2009 — China
 Pholcus yanjinensis Yao & Li, 2016 — China
 Pholcus yanqing (Yao, Li & Lu, 2022) — China
 Pholcus yaoshan Yao & Li, 2021 — China
 Pholcus yeoncheonensis m, Lee & Lee, 2015 — Korea
 Pholcus yeongwol Huber, 2011 — Korea
 Pholcus yi Yao & Li, 2012 — China
 Pholcus yichengicus Zhu, Tu & Shi, 1986 — China
 Pholcus yongshun Yao & Li, 2018 — China
 Pholcus yoshikurai Irie, 1997 — Japan
 Pholcus yuantu Yao & Li, 2012 — China
 Pholcus yugong Zhang & Zhu, 2009 — China
 Pholcus yuhuangshan Yao & Li, 2021 — China
 Pholcus yunnanensis Yao & Li, 2012 — China
 Pholcus yuxi Yao & Li, 2018 — China
 Pholcus zham Zhang, Zhu & Song, 2006 — China, Nepal
 Pholcus zhangae Zhang & Zhu, 2009 — China
 Pholcus zhaoi Yao, Pham & Li, 2015 — Vietnam
 Pholcus zhongdongensis Yao & Li, 2016 — China
 Pholcus zhui Yao & Li, 2012 — China
 Pholcus zhuolu Zhang & Zhu, 2009 — China
 Pholcus zichyi Kulczynski, 1901 — Russia, China, Korea

Identification resources 

 Pholcus of Europe: https://araneae.nmbe.ch/specieskey/263/Pholcus
 Pholcus of North America: https://bugguide.net/node/view/9609

References

Pholcidae
Araneomorphae genera
Cosmopolitan spiders